The 1976 Arizona State Sun Devils baseball team represented Arizona State University in the 1976 NCAA Division I baseball season. The Sun Devils played their home games at Packard Stadium, and played as part of the Western Athletic Conference. The team was coached by Jim Brock in his fifth season as head coach at Arizona State.

The Sun Devils reached the College World Series, their eighth appearance in Omaha, where they finished in third place after winning games against Washington State, and eventual champion Arizona, and losing a semifinal game against Arizona and another to fourth-place Eastern Michigan.

Personnel

Roster

Coaches

Schedule and results

References

Arizona State Sun Devils baseball seasons
Arizona State Sun Devils
College World Series seasons
Arizona State Sun Devils baseball